Omari Latif Hardwick (born January 9, 1974) is an American actor known for his starring role as James "Ghost" St. Patrick, the protagonist of Starz's Power and his role as Vanderohe in Zack Snyder's Army of the Dead (2021). He is also known for his roles in Saved and Dark Blue, in Spike Lee's Miracle at St. Anna (2008), Kick-Ass (2010), Tyler Perry's For Colored Girls (2010) and as Andre in BET Network's Being Mary Jane.

Early life and education 
Hardwick was born in Savannah, Georgia, the son of Joyce and Clifford Hardwick III, an attorney. Growing up in Decatur, Georgia, Hardwick wrote poetry on a regular basis, and participated in many sports. For high school he attended Marist School in Brookhaven, Georgia where he played baseball, basketball and football and attended University of Georgia on a football scholarship. Even though he was a star on the field, Hardwick continued in acting and poetry, and thus minored in theater.

Career 
After graduation, Hardwick initially pursued a career in football, hoping to join the San Diego Chargers. He declared himself for the NFL Draft, where he was not selected, after which he returned to acting.

As a struggling actor, Hardwick did odd jobs in order to pay for acting classes. After being unsuccessful, he started living in his car, and he finally got his break in the 2004 TV movie Sucker Free City. Next, he booked roles in the feature film The Guardian and a series regular role in Saved. For the role, he spent two years training as a fireman and a paramedic.

In 2002, Hardwick had a quick scene as an extra in Floetry's "Say Yes" music video.

In 2003 and 2004, he participated award-winningly in the National Poetry Slam.

In 2010, Hardwick became a founding member of "Plan B Inc. Theater Group", and a co-founder of "Actor's Lounge" at the Los Angeles Greenway Theater. He also founded production company "Bravelife Films". Hardwick was also featured in the urban lifestyle publication, Prominence Magazine for its Holiday issue.

In 2011, Hardwick received his best film reviews to date for his role as "Troy" in the critically acclaimed indie hit I Will Follow. Hardwick has guest starred on an episode of NBC's Chase as Chris Novak, a hard luck criminal facing prison.

In 2013, Hardwick was cast in the lead role of James "Ghost" St. Patrick on the Starz crime drama-thriller, Power.

In 2016, he was featured by a South African rapper, Nasty C on a song titled "A Star Is Born".

Hardwick co-starred in the science fiction comedy film Sorry to Bother You, which was released in theaters on July 6, 2018.

In July 2019, Hardwick was cast in Zack Snyder's Netflix film Army of the Dead.

In January 2021, it was announced that Hardwick was cast as Gordon Oliver in Netflix's thriller series Pieces of Her, which is adapted from the Karin Slaughter novel of the same name.

In April 2022, it was announced that Hardwick would star alongside Marsai Martin and Kelly Rowland in the Paramount+ film Fantasy Football, released on November 25.

Personal life 

Hardwick began a relationship with Jennifer "Jae" Pfautch in the 2000s. Pfautch, who is of Native American and German descent, was disowned by her family in the aftermath for dating outside of her race. In 2008, the couple's first child was stillborn. After losing his son, the actor lost his sister Shani Hardwick and brother Malik Hardwick. Omari and Jennifer married in June 2012 and have two children; daughter Nova and son Brave.

Filmography

Films

Television

Music videos

References

External links 

 
 

1974 births
Living people
21st-century American male actors
Actors from Savannah, Georgia
American male film actors
American male stage actors
American male television actors
African-American male actors
Georgia Bulldogs football players
Male actors from Georgia (U.S. state)
Marist School (Georgia) alumni
University of Georgia alumni
21st-century African-American people
20th-century African-American people